30 Days of Night: Immortal Remains is the second novel spinoff of the 30 Days of Night comic series. It is co-written by Steve Niles (who wrote the comic) and Jeff Mariotte. Immortal Remains is set after the second comic and centers on the vampire Dane, who travels to Savannah, Georgia after a series of brutal murders by another vampire nicknamed "The Headsman."
Now Dane must fight his own to ensure that the vampiric community remains a secret, returning to the start of it all, Barrow, Alaska.

2007 American novels
30 Days of Night novels
Novels by Jeff Mariotte
Works by Steve Niles
IDW Publishing adaptations